Five in Japan is a live album by Swamp Terrorists, released on July 18, 1997 by Sub/Mission and Metropolis Records.

Reception
Sonic Boom praised the production of Five in Japan and claimed "overall, the Swampies do an excellent job of sounding very tight live."

Track listing

Personnel
Adapted from the Five in Japan liner notes.

Swamp Terrorists
 Michael Antener (as STR) – programming, mastering
 Base-T – bass guitar
 Ane Hebeisen (as Ane H.) – lead vocals, production, mixing, mastering, photography
 Pit Lee – drums
 ND – electronics
 Spring – guitar

Production and design
 Kouhei Amano – recording
 Andre Grandchamp – recording
 Tetsuya Kitamura – recording
 Patrick Marbach – recording
 Hiroaki Maruyama – recording
 Patrick Niederer – recording
 Jens Schwarz – photography

Release history

References

External links 
 

1997 live albums
Swamp Terrorists albums
Metropolis Records live albums